Garfield: His 9 Lives is a 1984 book of illustrated short stories that showcase the "nine lives" of Jim Davis' comic strip character Garfield. The book is divided into ten segments; the first one displays the creation of cats in general, where the latter nine reveal events in Garfield's nine lives. Each of the nine stories has a short preface of Garfield in his modern incarnation, and explains how these various lives shaped aspects of Garfield's personality, such as the origin of his fear of the veterinarian, his love of grinny behavior, his proclivity for a slothful lifestyle, and his extremely playful side. The book was later adapted into an animated television special in 1988, and a comic book by BOOM Studios from 2014 to 2015.

The book 
 "In the Beginning" (written by Jim Davis, illustrated by Paws, Inc. staff): The cat is created.  The manner of the cat's creation, with a higher being dictating instructions to his staff and the language used by the staff while 'designing' the cat, is strongly similar to the manner in which products are designed in modern corporations. The staff wonders why the creator sees fit to give the cat nine lives opposed to the usual one, prompting the creator to reply that he likes cats, revealing that he has feline features.
 "Cave Cat" (written by Jim Davis; illustrated by Davis, Mike Fentz, and Larry Fentz): In the Stone Age, the first cat emerges from the sea and is domesticated. Cave Cat also meets his end when the vaguely reptilian giant dog (who resembles Odie and is termed Big Bob by the cavemen) attempts to play fetch with Cave Cat, throwing a tree at him and unintentionally crushing him. Garfield says that he formed many of his likes and dislikes with one dislike being his rock bed and his like being the pterodactyl drumsticks. (This, as Garfield points out, explains why most cats fear dogs, and why Garfield himself tends to dislike and mistreat Odie specifically.)
 "The Vikings" (written by Jim Davis and Mike Fentz; illustrated by Fentz): A group of Vikings from the year 984, including Garfield the Orange, frozen in an iceberg for a thousand years, thaw out and wake up in "an especially warm and lovely spring day of 1984", and attempt to 'pillage' St. Paul, Minnesota. They are forced to adapt to the modern era after a notable lack of success with traditional Viking activities, and comment how modern American society is a "barbaric" one which defended itself against the pillaging, as well as snapping the bra of the bosomy female Viking, Helga. Defeated, they succeed in securing employment and a house, but lose their proud spirits in the process. Garfield's Viking incarnation snaps them out of their ennui after he rediscovers the Petrified Weasel of Booga, the clan's patron god; it restores their spirits, causing them to revert to their Viking selves and proceed to run off to the Arctic Circle. The segment ends a thousand years in the future, with the strong implication that the same group of Vikings have been frozen in an iceberg and are about to thaw out once again in "an especially warm and lovely spring day of 2984". (This story explains why the otherwise lazy Garfield enjoys occasionally engaging in rampaging and destructive behavior he would seem too lazy to engage in, such as his constant attacks on the mailman.)
 "Babes and Bullets" (written by Ron Tuthill, illustrated by Kevin Campbell): Hard-boiled detective Sam Spayed (a play on Sam Spade) investigates the suspicious death of a priest in a segment reminiscent of classic noir fiction, with occasional illustrations done in a manner much more realistic than the usual Garfield style. It was later adapted into the television special Garfield: Babes and Bullets. Shortly before the story begins, Garfield appears, saying that the most significant thing he learned from this life was that he swore off work.
 "The Exterminators" (written by Jim Davis; illustrated by Davis, Mike Fentz, and Larry Fentz): A trio of Three Stooges-like cats chase a mouse, and mayhem ensues. Garfield comments that he officially retired from the 'rat race' following this life, leading to his strong dislike of mice as a food source.
 "Lab Animal" (written by Jim Davis; illustrated by Gary Barker and Larry Fentz): at a secret government facility, lab specimen 19-GB receives an unusual injection, followed by his escape from the military base. After swimming across a river, the serum has some unusual effects, causing 19-GB to become a dog. Fortunately for 19-GB, he became the same breed of dog the lab sent out to find him, allowing him to blend in with the search dogs. The pursuing soldiers then call off the search, as the dog looks at the reader with strange green eyes. Garfield claims that because of his experiences as a lab animal, he becomes nauseous at the sight of medical equipment.  (This most likely explains his fear of the veterinarian.)
 "The Garden" (written and illustrated by Dave Kühn): Cloey and her orange kitten play in a magical, Wonderland-like, garden, which was built by Cloey's joyful Uncle Tod. However, as with the Garden of Eden, there is a test of character which the pair must undergo...in this case, a crystal box on a checkered toadstool. The pair approach the crystal box, which they've been told must never be opened. After much suspense, the pair resists the temptation - believing that opening the box could harm Uncle Tod - and live happily in the garden forever. The segment is written with flowery prose similar to overly romantic poetry, and the illustrations have a strong surrealistic quality, as well as having many sharp graphics and neon colors that were characteristic of the 1980s. Garfield is shown happily smelling a flower's fragrance and said that his sixth life was his favorite. "My body grew old, but I never, never, never grew up".
 "Primal Self" (written by Jim Davis; illustrated by Jim Clements, Gary Barker, and Larry Fentz): An orange housecat (by the name of Tigger) meets an ancient, primal, dangerous, possibly evil force, causing him to revert to an entirely feral state.  The story ends with him preparing to attack his unsuspecting owner, an elderly woman; it is strongly suggested that he kills his owner afterwards. Garfield is shown to be terrified of the events in this life; he is depicted cowering under a blanket in his commentary on it, remarking that this life taught him that there are elements in a cat that are not to be toyed with.
 "Garfield" (written by Jim Davis; illustrated by Gary Barker and Valette Hildebrand; color by Doc Davis): Present-day Garfield meets lasagna, Jon, and Odie. This segment retcons the character's beginnings. Garfield notes that his current life is presently falling short of his expectations.
 "Space Cat" (written and illustrated by Jim Clements): While exploring outer space, Garfield encounters "The Incredibly Huge Galactic War Fleet" (IHGWF for short).  The IHGWF dislikes Garfield, and vaporizes him.  It is then shown that he is in a computerized simulator, and appears to be living in a world inhabited by both humans and anthropomorphic animals. The segment has a very strong resemblance to The Hitchhiker's Guide to The Galaxy series, in both tone and theme. Garfield and his ship get destroyed by the IHGWF, then he is seen emerging from a simulator at a video arcade, suggesting the life was only imagined or a video game. Garfield is shown as a cyborg during his commentary on it, remarking that while he'd like to live forever, he's well aware of his mortality and refers to the segment as a 'sneak peek of his next life.'

Television special 
  
The one-hour-long television adaptation produced in 1988 featured ten separate segments, just like the book. Six of these were adapted from the book, and an additional four were newly written for the show. The special aired on CBS on November 22, 1988. The events of the special take place during the first season of Garfield and Friends.

"Babes and Bullets" was adapted into a television special of its own, Garfield's Babes and Bullets, the following year, and won an Emmy Award for Outstanding Animated Program of 1989. "The Vikings", "The Exterminators" and "Primal Self" have never been adapted for television. The special is included on the DVD Garfield's Fantasies. In 2018, a DVD version was released. This was the eighth of twelve Garfield television specials made between 1982 and 1991.
 
 "In the Beginning" (directed by Phil Roman): God orders that the cat be created according to His specifications. Unlike the rest of the special, this prologue sequence is shot in live-action.  (The scene where the angels question why God gives cats nine lives varies slightly from the storybook version; God's feline features are not seen—yet; He simply states that it might make a "great plot for a story".)
 "Cave Cat" (directed by Phil Roman and George Singer): "In my first life, I formulated many of my likes and dislikes. I disliked my rock bed. On the other hand, you wouldn't believe the size of the Pteradon drumsticks." Evolution takes place, as 10 million years ago, cat first swims out of the sea into its neanderthal-like state. The segment is full of comedic sketches depicting some primitive life characteristics, including the hunting routine and the first steps to learn how to "talk".
 "King Cat" (directed by Phil Roman and John Sparey): "2000 B.C. was a good year to be a cat in Egypt. We were revered, even worshipped. Ah, for the good old days." In Ancient Egypt, the Pharaoh's sacred cat discovers what happens to him if the Pharaoh dies. "King Cat" must try to defend the king from his evil brother to prevent this fate. This was the first of the new segments introduced in the special. Since cats were worshipped in Ancient Egypt, it was in this life where Garfield developed his love for being pampered and waited on.
 "In the Garden" (directed by Phil Roman and Ruth Kissane): "My third life was my favorite. My body grew old, but I never, never, never grew up." A  young kitten who looks like a stripe-less Garfield and its human companion have a happy life dancing on a dream-like garden, but they are tempted by a mysterious box that can never be opened for an unclear reason. Filled with surreal elements, the segment ends exploring the idea of curiosity and how it may lead to an unknown (and maybe inconvenient) path.
 "Court Musician" (directed by Bob Scott): "I learned to think on my feet in my fourth life. Thinking was okay, I guess, but now I avoid it whenever possible." In 1720, the king demands a concerto from "Freddie" Handel, and if the king doesn't enjoy it ... Under the pressure of a deadline and a jester who wants him to fail, "Freddie" delegates the concerto's finale to his pet, one of Garfield's incarnations, a blue cat in this life. This segment is animated in a style similar to the cartoon shorts of UPA in the 1950s. Like "King Cat," this segment and the following two were created specifically for television.
 "Stunt Cat" (directed by Phil Roman, Bill Littlejohn and Bob Nesler): "Life No. 5 was short..." Garfield is a stunt double in a Krazy Kat animated silent film and is killed almost instantly as Ignatz drops a load of bricks on Garfield.
 "Diana's Piano" (directed by Doug Frankel): "Six must be my lucky number, because that's the life I fell in love with music. I also fell in love with a girl who played the piano just for me." A young girl, Sara, receives a cat, Diana, who goes with her everywhere, especially to piano lessons. This is the only one of Garfield's lives, in either the book or special, where the cat is explicitly identified as female. The story itself is told in a flashback, with the animation reminiscent of watercolor paintings. In addition, the story is closer than any of the others to reality; the cat, Diana, is just a normal cat. Taking into account the fact that Sara would play the piano only for Diana, Garfield considers this life as his luckiest since he developed a love for music in it.
 "Lab Animal" (directed by Phil Roman and Doug Frankel): "In my seventh life, I was a laboratory animal. To this day, every time I see a test tube, I throw up." Test animal 19-GB makes a daring escape to avoid dissection. 19-GB's appearance was similar to that of Oliver from Oliver & Company and the story and animation was similar to The Plague Dogs and Felidae. Garfield's commentary varies slightly from the book, saying that he becomes nauseous at the sight of scientific equipment rather than medical equipment.
 "Garfield" (directed by Phil Roman, John Sparey and Bob Nesler): "All that I ever was made me what I am in my eighth life. Somehow it's falling short of my expectations..." Prequel to Garfield on the Town. Dating back to 1978, Garfield is born and soon taken in by Jon, who then buys Odie.
 "Space Cat" (directed by Phil Roman, John Sparey and Bob Nesler): "I'd like to think I'll live forever, but hey, I'm only human. Here's a sneak preview of my ninth life." In a "sneak preview" of his ninth life, Garfield and Odie try to retaliate when the IHGWF (led by "Commander Mendelson", named after Film Roman producer Lee Mendelson) threatens to destroy them. Garfield and Odie are killed at the end of this life, and meet God in the afterlife. Because the odds were so unfairly stacked against Garfield and Odie (and because God hadn't been able to keep track of the lives Garfield had lived through due to Heaven's computers being down at the time), the pair are given all nine lives back. After they vanish, the special concludes when with His cat eyes now visible (and thus revealing that God is also a Garfield's self) God-Garfield says: "We have to stick together, you know."

International television 
Australia
 Network Ten

Canada
 CTV

Mexico
 American Network
 Boomerang (Latin America)

The Philippines
 GMA Network

UK/Ireland:
 ITV (September 16, 1989)
 RTÉ Two (Ireland, late-1990s)
 Fox Kids (UK & Ireland, 2000s)

USA
 CBS

Hungary
 RTL Klub
 Magyar Televízió

Chile
 Universidad Católica de Chile Televisión

Cast 
 Lorenzo Music –  Garfield
 Thom Huge – Jon / Caveman #1 / "Junior" / Soldier / Computer
 Gregg Berger –  Odie / Jester / Scientist #1 / Narrator: Cave Cat

 Additional voices
 Desirée Goyette –  Chloe / Sara: Diana's Piano
 Nino Tempo – Luigi / Black Bart
 Hal Smith – George Frideric Handel / Larry: Lab Animal
 Sandi Huge – Garfield's Mom: Garfield / Sara's Mom: Diana's Piano
 Carolyn Davis – Old Sara: Diana's Piano
 Frank Welker – Mendelson
 C. Lindsay Workman – God-Garfield
 Heather Kerr
 Ed Bogas

The comic 
From 2014 to 2015, BOOM Studios adapted His 9 Lives across four comics, with each story drawn by a different artist. It can be seen as a hybrid of the book and the special as, like the special, it features several lives created exclusively for it. Garfield's eighth life, the current one, is also left out altogether, with each life's prologue instead being set during the eighth life.

 1. "Cave Cat" (art by David DeGrand) 
 2. "King Cat" (art by Kari Smith)
 3. "Pirate Cat" (art by Roger Langridge)
 4. "Cowboy Cat" (art by Yehudi Mercado)
 5. "Super Cat" (art by Brittney L. Williams)
 6. "Babes and Bullets" (art by Andy Hirsch)
 7. "Lab Cat" (art by Frazer Irving)
 8. "Space Cat" (art by Genevieve FT)

References

External links 
 
 Garfield: His 9 Lives at the Big Cartoon DataBase
  (one of the stories from the book was made into its own special)

1984 short story collections
Garfield television specials
1980s American television specials
1980s animated television specials
1988 television specials
1988 in American television
CBS television specials
Television shows directed by Phil Roman
Ballantine Books books
Books about cats
Film Roman television specials
Fiction set in prehistory
Fiction set in the 2nd millennium BC
Fiction set in 1720
Fiction set in 1978
Fiction about reincarnation